Abdul Majid Talukdar is a Bangladesh Nationalist Party politician and the former Member of Parliament of Bogra-3. His son, Abdul Momen Talukder, was also elected to Parliament from Bogra-3.

Career
Talukdar was elected to parliament from Bogra-3 as a Bangladesh Nationalist Party candidate in 1979, 1991, and 1996.

References

2002 deaths
Bangladesh Nationalist Party politicians
2nd Jatiya Sangsad members
5th Jatiya Sangsad members
7th Jatiya Sangsad members
Year of birth missing